Esfehanjiq (also Romanized as Eşfehānjīq; also known as Eşfehānjūq) is a village in Sarajuy-ye Gharbi Rural District, in the Central District of Maragheh County, East Azerbaijan Province, Iran. At the 2006 census, its population was 814, in 188 families.

References 

Towns and villages in Maragheh County